Kelley Peak is the name of two geographical features:
 Kelley Peak (Texas), a mountain peak in Edwards County, Texas
 Kelley Peak (Antarctica), a mountain peak in Antarctica